Blanca Padilla (born 7 January 1995) is a Spanish model. She was the face of Dolce & Gabbana. In October 2017, she became the new face of Givenchy Beauty.

Career
Padilla began modeling after an agent spotted her on the subway in Madrid when she was a student at the ESIC Business & Marketing School. She is signed to NEXT Model Management.

In February 2014, she was named "Female Model of the Year" at the 59th edition of the Mercedes-Benz Madrid Fashion Week, for her elegance. That same year, after covering Telva twice and Yo Dona as well as appearing in an editorial for CYL Magazine, she walked the Victoria's Secret Fashion Show, being the fourth Spanish model to do so after Esther Cañadas, Eugenia Silva and Clara Alonso. She also opened three fashion shows during fashion week.

In 2015, she was featured in campaigns for Dolce & Gabbana and Suiteblanco. She also made her Vogue cover debut in the February issue of Vogue España which was the first time in nine years that a Spanish model covered Vogue Spain, the last one being Marina Perez. and Mujer Hoy, and posed in an editorial for Elle Spain. She was on the cover of the February issue of Vogue Mexico in 2016. She launched a campaign for Brandon Maxwell on the same year. Other brands such as Calzedonia, Ralph Russo, El Corte Inglés, Aritzia and Marc Jacobs Accessories featured her in campaigns the following year. She became the new face of Givenchy Beauty in October 2017.

She has walked the runway for brands such as Dolce & Gabbana, the iconic Givenchy, and in one show, she was the only one to have two looks and close the last show of Riccardo Tisci for the brand. She has also walked for Chanel, Dior, Carolina Herrera, Tommy Hilfiger, Alberta Ferreti, Zac Posen, Anna Sui, Elie Saab, Valentino, Moschino, Anthony Vaccarello, Giorgio Armani, Emporio Armani, Versace, Brandon Maxwell, Oscar De La Renta, Lacoste, Desigual, Moncler, Mango, Miu Miu, Etro, Bottega Veneta, Dsquared2, La Perla, Alexandre Vauthier, Balmain, Max Mara, Jacquemus, Philipp Plein, Jeremy Scott, Massimo Dutti, Costume National, Blumarine, Ermanno Scervino, Salvatore Ferragamo, Prabal Gurung, Ralph Lauren, Trussardi, Giambattista Valli, J. Crew,  Lanvin and Victoria's Secret.

In December 2017, she was awarded Glamour's International Model Award.

References

External links

 
 

Living people
1995 births
Spanish female models
Next Management models
People from Madrid